This is a list of the number-one hits of 1958 and 1959 on Italian Hit Parade Singles Chart.

See also
1958 in music
1959 in music
List of number-one hits in Italy

References

1959 in Italian music
1959 record charts
1959